Bramley and Stanningley is a ward in the metropolitan borough of the City of Leeds, West Yorkshire, England.  It contains 37 listed buildings that are recorded in the National Heritage List for England.  All the listed buildings are designated at Grade II, the lowest of the three grades, which is applied to "buildings of national importance and special interest".  The ward is to the northwest of the centre of Leeds, and includes the areas of Bramley, Moorside, Rodley, Stanningley, and Whitecote.  Most of the listed buildings are houses, cottages and associated structures.  The Leeds and Liverpool Canal runs through the ward, and the listed buildings associated with it are two locks and two bridges crossing it.  The other listed buildings include churches and associated structures, public houses, a retaining wall retaining items involved in the early supply of water to the area, schools, a former bank, and public swimming baths.


Buildings

References

Citations

Sources

 

Lists of listed buildings in West Yorkshire